Eucharassus hovorei is a species of beetle in the family Cerambycidae. It was described by Monne in 2007.

References

Necydalopsini
Beetles described in 2007